The North is the sixth full-length studio album by Canadian indie pop band Stars. It was released on September 4, 2012, through ATO Records. The album has been characterized as having a more upbeat feel to it compared to previous works, as Amy Millan notes: the album was meant to be "playful, joyful and hopeful." The album debuted at number 5 on the Canadian Albums Chart.

The album's cover shows the Habitat 67 complex, an experimental housing development as well as architectural landmark in Montreal, the band's home city.

Track listing

Reception
The album has received mainly positive reviews from music critics. Metacritic assigned an average score of 70 to the album based on 22 reviews, which indicates "generally favorable reviews."

Personnel
The North album personnel adapted from Discogs.

Stars
Amy Millan - guitar, vocals
Torquil Campbell - keyboard, vocals
Chris Seligman - piano, keyboards, synthesizer, french horn
Evan Cranley - bass, guitar, synthesizer, percussion, trombone
Patty McGee - drums, percussion
Production
Graham Lessard - engineer
Marcus Paquin - engineer
Chris McCarron - guitar technician (maintenance)
Dave Cooley - mastering
Tony Hoffer - mixing
Chris Claypool - mixing (assistant)
Graham Lessard - production
Marcus Paquin - production
Stars - production
David Carswell- additional recording
John Collins - additional recording
Artwork
The Cardboardbox Project, Derek Broad - album artwork

References

External links
 

2012 albums
Stars (Canadian band) albums